Crown Hill Formation is a late Ediacaran volcanic non-marine sedimentary formation in Newfoundland. It's topped off with a bright red conglomerate, with silt and arkose sands of similar hue too.

It's subdivided into nine facies, including (on Random Island) Brook Point, Duntara Harbour, Red Cliff (with Bluye Point Horizon subfacies') and Broad Head.
(on Cape St Mary's) Cross Pt Member, Hurrican Brook Mmbr

References 

Ediacaran Newfoundland and Labrador